Maintal is the second largest town of the Main-Kinzig district, in Hesse, Germany. It is situated on the river Main, between Frankfurt am Main and Hanau.

Geography

Neighbouring places
The neighbouring countries of  Maintal are Niederdorfelden and Schöneck in the north, the city of Hanau in the East, Mühlheim am Main and Offenbach am Main on the other bank of the river Main as well as Frankfurt am Main in the west.

Division of the town
Maintal consists of the four districts Dörnigheim, Bischofsheim, Hochstadt (seat of city-administration) and Wachenbuchen.

History
The city was artificially created in 1974 in the course of the Hessian administration reform by merging the city of Dörnigheim (now Maintal's biggest district) with the nearby towns of Bischofsheim, Hochstadt and Wachenbuchen.

Economy
Syngenta Agro GmbH
Altec Lansing
Rasmussen GmbH

Transport
Maintal is connected with Hanau and Frankfurt by the so-called nordmainische Eisenbahn (northern Main railway) and has two stations (Maintal-West in Bischofsheim near the Main river and Maintal-East in Dörnigheim)

Two ferries cross the Main to the left, or south, bank. The Rumpenheim Ferry links Bischofsheim with Rumpenheim, whilst the Maintal-Dörnigheim Ferry links Dörnigheim with Mühlheim am Main.

Twin towns – sister cities

Maintal is twinned with:
 Luisant, France (1973)
 Moosburg, Austria (1976)
 Esztergom, Hungary (1993)
 Katerini, Greece (1995)

References

External links
  
 

Towns in Hesse
Main-Kinzig-Kreis